Amelanchier laevis, the smooth shadbush, smooth serviceberry or Allegheny serviceberry, is a North American species of tree in the rose family Rosaceae, growing up to  tall. It is native to eastern Canada and the eastern United States, from Newfoundland west to Ontario, Minnesota, and Iowa, south as far as Georgia and Alabama.

Description
The leaves have 12–17 lateral veins and 6-8 teeth per cm. The white blossoms, which can be spectacular in mature specimens, develop from pink buds in spring. The fruit, which are pomes, ripen in autumn. They are edible and can be eaten raw or cooked. The fruit has a sweet flavor. The bark can be made into a herbal medicine for expectant mothers. It is a deciduous tree hardy in zones 4 to 8. It is cultivated as an ornamental shrub. 

The cultivar 'R.J. Hilton', with richer spring and autumn leaf color than the species, has gained the Royal Horticultural Society's Award of Garden Merit.

References

External links

 
 Photo taken in Virginia by David Stang, showing flowers of Amelanchier laevis

laevis
Trees of Canada
Trees of the Eastern United States
Plants described in 1912
Taxa named by Karl McKay Wiegand